The discography of Method Man, an American rapper, consists of seven studio albums (including one collaborative album) and 34 singles (including 16 as a featured artist). Method Man embarked on his music career in 1992, as a member of East Coast hip hop group Wu-Tang Clan. After the Wu-Tang Clan released their highly acclaimed debut album Enter the Wu-Tang (36 Chambers) (1993), Method Man would be the first member to release his solo debut album. In November 1994, he released Tical, under Def Jam Recordings. His debut album Tical, features his biggest hit single to date, "I'll Be There for You/You're All I Need to Get By", which features American R&B singer Mary J. Blige and peaked at number three on the US Billboard Hot 100. Method Man would then go on to collaborate with fellow East Coast rapper Redman, and subsequently form a duo together.

Albums

Studio albums

Collaborative albums

Singles

As lead artist

As featured artist

Guest appearances

See also
Method Man & Redman discography
Wu-Tang Clan discography

References

Hip hop discographies
 
Discographies of American artists